Hans Pauli Olsen (born 1957 in Tórshavn, Faroe Islands) is a Faroese sculptor currently living in Denmark, and held in high regard.

He is one of the most popular artists in the Faroes. His work is found not only in art galleries but also in many towns in the Faroes, especially in the Faroese capital Tórshavn. His work was featured on two Faroese stamps issued by Postverk Føroya in April 1993

References

Faroese artists Hans Pauli Olsen C.V.

External links
Hans Pauli Olsen Artist's website

1957 births
Living people
People from Tórshavn
Faroese sculptors
Danish sculptors
Danish male artists
Male sculptors